Kathryn (Kathy) Lueders (pronounced "Leaders") is an American engineer and business manager. Lueders is currently leading NASA's human spaceflight program as the Associate Administrator of the Human Exploration and Operations (HEO) Mission Directorate. She became the first woman to head human spaceflight. She was previously the program manager for NASA's Commercial Crew Program and oversaw the return of human spaceflight capabilities to NASA.

Personal life 
Kathy grew up in Japan. Her family was living in Tokyo when the Apollo 11 moon landing occurred. She remembers her dad waking the whole family up for the event. She read Isaac Asimov while growing up.

In her undergraduate degree, Lueders studied business, as she had had aspirations to work on Wall Street. During her senior year, however, she wanted to switch to engineering after seeing her roommate study it. She became "interested in engineering because it gave me the tools to solve problems and work on something bigger." After getting married and having two children, she returned to college to study engineering. She is also raising children born after she completed her masters degree. Her daughter was in tears the day she learned that Oppy, the Opportunity (rover), "died" on Mars.

Education 
Lueders earned her bachelor's degree of Business Administration in finance from the University of New Mexico in 1986. She also has a Bachelor of Science (1993) and Master of Science (1999) in industrial engineering from New Mexico State University.

NASA career 
Lueders began her NASA career as a co-op in 1992 in the safety and mission assurance office as a quality engineer at the White Sands Test Facility while still a student at New Mexico State. As only the second woman to work at the facility, after graduation Lueders started as the depot manager of the Space Shuttle program Orbital Maneuvering System and Reaction Control Systems. She was the Commercial Orbital Transportation Services Integration manager. She has also held several managerial positions within the International Space Station Program Office at NASA Johnson Space Center in Houston, Texas.

She also managed the commercial cargo resupply services (CRS) to the space station and was responsible for NASA's oversight of international partner spacecraft visiting the space station, including the European Space Agency's Automated Transfer Vehicle, the Japan Aerospace Exploration Agency’s H-II Transfer Vehicle, and the Russian space agency Roscosmos’ Soyuz and Progress spacecraft.  She went to Kennedy Space Center as the acting Commercial Crew (CCP) Program Manager in 2013, and was selected as the head of the office in 2014. As this was NASA's first venture into commercial human spaceflight, Lueders brought of her knowledge and experience from CRS to the formation and management of CCP.

Lueders managed a NASA team working with SpaceX and Boeing teams concurrently over seven years. She was the CCP manager when SpaceX launched the Crew Dragon Demo-2 mission on May 30, 2020, the first human launch from U.S. soil since the retirement of the Space Shuttle in July 2011. After the launch, she said “I am so grateful and proud of our NASA and SpaceX team." The mission occurred during the COVID-19 pandemic and NASA had to adjust to social distancing protocols.

On June 12, 2020, NASA Administrator Jim Bridenstine announced Kathy Lueders to be the agency’s new associate administrator of the Human Exploration and Operations (HEO) Mission Directorate. While considering whether or not to take the position, her husband pointed out she'd be the first woman in the position.

Lueders indicates “Together, we are solving problems every day and it’s one of my favorite aspects of the job.” She was drawn to her jobs at NASA for the challenging problems the industry presents and not because she was a "space geek." She says "exploration is a team sport" and advocates working together with and giving space to all willing partners while discussing the Artemis program. She appreciates that being with NASA enables her to operate in a world community with other space-faring nations peacefully.

External links 
 Kennedy Biographies - Kathryn Lueders

References 

American women engineers
NASA people
Year of birth missing (living people)
Living people
New Mexico State University alumni
University of New Mexico alumni
21st-century women engineers
21st-century American women